The Coast Guard Command is the coast guard service of Turkey. The Turkish Coast Guard is under the command of the Ministry of the Interior. However, during wartime some of its elements can be subordinated to Turkish Naval Forces by the President.

The Turkish Coast Guard is organized into four area commands: the Black Sea, the Sea of Marmara, the Aegean Sea, and the Mediterranean Sea.

Organization
Affiliated with the Guarding Administration (Turkish: Muhafaza Memurluğu), the Coast Guard is responsible for controlling the maritime jurisdiction areas and coasts of Turkiye and fighting all kind of illegal action in the responsibility area. Turkish Coast Guard is also the main Search and Rescue Coordination Authority in Turkish SAR Zone.

Strength
With a personnel strength of about 5,500, the coast guard is responsible for maintaining the security of the coast and territorial waters. The Coast guard is also responsible of search and rescue (SAR) operations, and for protecting the marine environment.

Mission
Coast Guard Command is a security service, established on 9 July 1982 by Act 2692, with the purpose of performing missions such as; providing the security of Turkish coasts, territorial waters and inland waters such as the Marmara Sea, Istanbul and Çanakkale Straits, ports and harbors and exercising such rights and powers where Turkey exercises sovereign rights under the rules of both national and international laws at sea areas which fall outside the scope of the general responsibility of the Turkish Naval Forces and to prevent and pursue all kinds of smuggling activities carried out by way of sea.
The missions, Coast Guard Command was charged with by Act 2692 are:

To protect and provide the security of our coasts and territorial waters,
To provide the safety of life and property at sea.
To take necessary measures for untethered mines, explosives and suspicious material identified in the sea and on the coast and report them to the authorities concerned.
To observe and inspect the operating conditions of the aids-to-navigation and report the deficiencies observed to the authorities concerned,
To disarm the refugees entering into our territorial waters and deliver them to the authorities concerned.
To prevent all kinds of smuggling carried out by way of sea.
To prevent the actions of the vessels and sea craft in violation of the laws on radio hygiene, passport, anchoring, mooring, fishing, diving and hoisting the flag.
To inspect the fishing of aquatic products,
To conduct inspections in order to prevent marine pollution.
To prevent the smuggling of antiquities by conducting inspections on diving activities.
To perform search and rescue missions within the search and rescue area of Turkey, in conformity with the International Search and Rescue Convention and National Search and Rescue Regulations.
To inspect the yacht tourism,
To participate in the operations conducted for the security of homeland under the command of the Naval Forces, when so ordered.

Public order units 
 Coast Guard Command (Ankara)
 Coast Guard Academy (Ankara)
 Coast Guard Marmara and Straits Regional Command (Istanbul)
 Coast Guard Istanbul Group Command
 Coast Guard İmralı Special Task Group Command
 Coast Guard Southern Marmara Group Command (Bursa)
 Coast Guard Çanakkale Group Command
 Coast Guard North Aegean Group Command (Ayvalık / Çanakkale)
 Coast Guard Marmara and Straits Regional Repair Support Command (Istanbul)
 Sarıyer District Coast Guard Command (Sarıyer / İstanbul)
 Coast Guard Sarıyer Central Police Station Command (Yenimahalle / İstanbul)
 Beşiktaş District Coast Guard Command (Beşiktaş / İstanbul)
 Coast Guard station command (İstinye / Istanbul)
 Tuzla District Coast Guard Command (Tuzla / Istanbul)
 Coast Guard Tuzla Police Station Command (Tuzla / Istanbul)
 Kefken District Coast Guard Command (Kefken / Kocaeli)
 Bakırköy District Coast Guard Command (Ataköy / Istanbul)
 Coast Guard Ataköy Central Police Station (Ataköy Marina / Istanbul)
 Coast Guard Coast Watch Station (MOBESE = Security camera) (Istanbul)
 Coast Guard Küçükkuyu Patrol Command (Küçükkuyu / Çanakkale)
 Coast Guard Black Sea Regional Command (Samsun)
 Coast Guard Trabzon Group Command
 Coast Guard Amasra Group Command
 Coast Guard Supply Support Command
 Coast Guard Black Sea Region Repair Support Command
 Coast Guard Aegean Sea Regional Command (İzmir)
 Coast Guard South Aegean Group Command
 Coast Guard North Aegean Group Command
 Coast Guard Aegean Sea Regional Repair Support Command
 Radio Coast Guard (104.7 mhz.) (İzmir)
 Bodrum Coast Guard Police Station Command (Bodrum / Muğla)
 Coast Guard Mediterranean Regional Command (Mersin)
 Coast Guard Antalya Group Command
 Coast Guard İskenderun Group Command
 Coast Guard Çevlik Patrol Command (Çevlik / Hatay)
 Coast Guard Air Command (İzmir)
 Coast Guard Samsun Air Group Command
 Coast Guard Antalya Air Group Command
 Coast Guard Air Stand Training Fleet Command
 Coast Guard Air Operations Command
 Coast Guard Air Supply and Maintenance Command
 Coast Guard Training and Education Command (Antalya)
 Coast Guard Schools Command
 Coast Guard Training Central Command
 Coast Guard Supply Center Command (Istanbul)
 Units subject to Coast Guard Regional Commands
 Coast Guard Central Station Commands
 Coast Guard Patrol Commands and affiliated boat Commands
 Diving Safety Security and Search and Rescue
Coast Guard Intelligence Directorate

Equipment
Surface patrols are carried out by 52 patrol vessels and smaller craft. The most effective of these are 14 search-and-rescue vessels ||220 tons of Turkish design. Smaller 150 ton and 70 ton patrol boats of German design were nearing obsolescence in the mid 1990s. An ambitious construction plan foresaw a major strengthening of the service with eight new vessels of 350–400 tons and 48 ships of 180–300 tons. Will be integrated ADVENT MARTI Air Command Control System for CN-235 aircraft.Coast Guard is equipped also with 8 mobile radars.

Handguns

 SAR 9

Submachine guns

 SAR 109T
 MP5

Assault rifles

 MPT 76
 MPT 55

Machine guns

 CANIK M2 QCB

Remote controlled weapon station

 ASELSAN STAMP

Ranks
Officers

Enlisted

The Force's highest-ranking officer is a Rear Admiral U.H. (Tümamiral). The coast guards wear the same rank and rate insignia as ordinary navy officers but with an orange thin arc-shaped stripe, with the words "Sahil Güvenlik" (Coast Guards) embroidered in black, worn on their upper right arm, close to the shoulder. Also, special pennants are flown for the senior officers of the Coast Guard.

 Commander of the Coast Guard : For the Commander of the Coast Guard, a square orange coloured flag with a black stripe connecting the lower mast side and upper right corner of the flag, also bearing two bombs (one on the upper mast side, the other on the opposite corner) is flown.
 Coast Guard Commander (Rank of Captain) : For these officers, a swallow tailed pennant with a horizontal black stripe across the flag, dividing it in two, also bearing a bomb on each side of the stripe, is flown.
 Coast Guard School Commander : The Coast Guard School Commander has a square orange flag, with a white anchor in the center and a vertical black stripe just near the mast.
 Coast Guard Group Commander : The Group Commander has a triangular orange pennant, with a black anchor in the middle.

Gallery

See also
Maritime Search and Security Operations Team
Turkish Naval Forces

Notes

References

External links

 
Specialist law enforcement agencies of Turkey
1859 establishments in the Ottoman Empire